Jules-Louis-Auguste Benois (25 February, 1852 St Petersburg-26 July, 1929, Vologda) was a Russian architect.

Jukles was a member of the Benois family.

Benois designed the Ligovsky People's House, close to the impoverished district of Ligovka, St. Petersburg.

References

1852 births
1929 deaths
19th-century architects from the Russian Empire
20th-century Russian architects
Architects from Saint Petersburg
Benois family